Enterpia laudeti is a species of moth of the family Noctuidae. It is found in southern Europe, Ukraine, European part of south-eastern Russia, Kazakhstan, Turkmenistan, Iran, Iraq, Israel, Lebanon, Syria, Jordan, the Sinai in Egypt and the Arabian Peninsula. 
 
Adults are on wing from March to May. There is one generation per year.

The larvae feed on Silene and Gypsophila species.

Subspecies
Enterpia laudeti laudeti
Enterpia laudeti orientis 
Enterpia laudeti roseomarginata (Palestine,…)

External links

Hadeninae of Israel
Lepiforum.de

Hadenini
Moths of Europe
Moths of the Middle East
Moths described in 1840
Taxa named by Jean Baptiste Boisduval